Leslie Montgomery Duxbury (13 June 1926 – 17 October 2005) was a British newspaper sports writer and columnist born in Great Harwood, Lancashire. He turned his attention to television and became a writer for the ITV1 soap opera, Coronation Street, retiring from the series in 1991.

References

External links 

1926 births
2005 deaths
English soap opera writers
People from Great Harwood
20th-century English screenwriters